Kota Srinivas Vyas was an Andhra Pradesh Cadre Indian Police Service officer of the 1974 batch. He is known for founding the Greyhounds police unit.

Career
K. S. Vyas was the first superintendent of police for the Vijayawada Urban district, which was formed in 1983. He became a cult figure among youths in the State wanting to join the police force.

Kota successfully dealt with Vijayawada rowdy menaces in the 1980s. He was the first police officer to arrest the goons. This incident was a sensation at that time and instantly made him a superhero.

In 1989, he founded the elite Greyhounds police unit for anti-Naxal Communist operations and also founded the Special Investigation Branch (SIB) that provided intelligence support on the subject.  He became joint director of the Andhra Pradesh Police Academy (APPA).

Death
K. S. Vyas was high on Communist Party of India (Marxist–Leninist) People's War's hit list because he was the architect of the elite Greyhounds to be exclusively involved in anti-Naxalite operations in the state. Though he eventually was moved out of anti-Naxalite task force, he was consulted regularly on operations.

On 27 January 1993, Kota lost his life in a surprise attack by Mohammed Nayeemuddin and four other members of the CPI (M-L) People's War Group (PWG) while taking an evening jog at Lal Bahadur Shastri Stadium, Hyderabad. GreyHounds commandos subsequently hunted down and shot Mohammed Nayeemuddin to death at the Millenium Township in Shadnagar, 48 km from Hyderabad, on 8 August 2016.

A police complex has been named after Kota in Vijayawada and an annual memorial lecture is given at the APPA.

References

Telugu people
Indian Police Service officers
1993 deaths
Year of birth missing